For motorized vehicles, such as automobiles, aircraft, and watercraft, vehicle dynamics is the study of vehicle motion, e.g., how a vehicle's forward movement changes in response to driver inputs, propulsion system outputs, ambient conditions, air/surface/water conditions, etc.

Vehicle dynamics is a part of engineering primarily based on classical mechanics.

Factors affecting vehicle dynamics 
The aspects of a vehicle's design which affect the dynamics can be grouped into drivetrain and braking, suspension and steering, distribution of mass, aerodynamics and tires.

Drivetrain and braking 
 Automobile layout (i.e. location of engine and driven wheels)
 Powertrain
 Braking system

Suspension and steering
Some attributes relate to the geometry of the suspension, steering and chassis. These include:
 Ackermann steering geometry
 Axle track
 Camber angle
 Caster angle
 Ride height
 Roll center
 Scrub radius
 Steering ratio
 Toe
 Wheel alignment
 Wheelbase

Distribution of mass 
Some attributes or aspects of vehicle dynamics are purely due to mass and its distribution. These include:
 Center of mass
 Moment of inertia
 Roll moment
 Sprung mass
 Unsprung mass
 Weight distribution

Aerodynamics 
Some attributes or aspects of vehicle dynamics are purely aerodynamic. These include:
 Automobile drag coefficient
 Automotive aerodynamics
 Center of pressure
 Downforce
 Ground effect in cars

Tires 
Some attributes or aspects of vehicle dynamics can be attributed directly to the tires. These include:
 Camber thrust
 Circle of forces
 Contact patch
 Cornering force
 Ground pressure
 Pacejka's Magic Formula
 Pneumatic trail
 Radial Force Variation
 Relaxation length
 Rolling resistance
 Self aligning torque
 Skid
 Slip angle
 Slip (vehicle dynamics)
 Spinout
 Steering ratio
 Tire load sensitivity

Vehicle behaviours 

Some attributes or aspects of vehicle dynamics are purely dynamic. These include:
 Body flex
 Body roll
 Bump Steer
 Bundorf analysis
 Directional stability
 Critical speed
 Noise, vibration, and harshness
 Pitch
 Ride quality
 Roll
 Speed wobble
  Understeer, oversteer, lift-off oversteer, and fishtailing
 Weight transfer and load transfer
 Yaw

Analysis and simulation
The dynamic behavior of vehicles can be analysed in several different ways. This can be as straightforward as a simple spring mass system, through a three-degree of freedom (DoF) bicycle model, to a large degree of complexity using a multibody system simulation package such as  MSC ADAMS or Modelica. As computers have gotten faster, and software user interfaces have improved, commercial packages such as CarSim have become widely used in industry for rapidly evaluating hundreds of test conditions much faster than real time. Vehicle models are often simulated with advanced controller designs provided as software in the loop (SIL) with controller design software such as Simulink, or with physical hardware in the loop (HIL).

Vehicle motions are largely due to the shear forces generated between the tires and road, and therefore the tire model is an essential part of the math model. In current vehicle simulator models, the tire model is the weakest and most difficult part to simulate. The tire model must produce realistic shear forces during braking, acceleration, cornering, and combinations, on a range of surface conditions. Many models are in use. Most are semi-empirical, such as the Pacejka Magic Formula model.

Racing car games or simulators are also a form of vehicle dynamics simulation.  In early versions many simplifications were necessary in order to get real-time performance with reasonable graphics. However, improvements in computer speed have combined with interest in realistic physics, leading to driving simulators that are used for vehicle engineering using detailed models such as CarSim.

It is important that the models should agree with real world test results, hence many of the following tests are correlated against results from instrumented test vehicles.

Techniques include:
 Linear range constant radius understeer
 Fishhook
 Frequency response
 Lane change
 Moose test
 Sinusoidal steering
 Skidpad
 Swept path analysis

See also 
 Automotive suspension design
 Automobile handling
 Hunting oscillation
 Multi-axis shaker table
 Vehicular metrics
 4-poster
 7 post shaker

References

Further reading 
 A new way of representing tyre data obtained from measurements in pure cornering and pure braking conditions. 
 Mathematically oriented derivation of standard vehicle dynamics equations, and definitions of standard terms.
  Vehicle dynamics as developed by Maurice Olley from the 1930s onwards. First comprehensive analytical synthesis of vehicle dynamics.
 Latest and greatest, also the standard reference for automotive suspension engineers. 
 Vehicle dynamics and chassis design from a race car perspective.
 Handling, Braking, and Ride of Road and Race Cars.
 Lecture Notes to the MOOC Vehicle Dynamics of iversity

 
Automotive engineering
Automotive technologies
Driving techniques
Dynamics (mechanics)
Vehicle technology